Yetholm television relay station is a relay transmitter of Selkirk, covering Kirk Yetholm and Town Yetholm in the Scottish Borders, as well as the village of Mindrum in Northumberland (although English services are not broadcast from this transmitter). It is owned and operated by Arqiva.

Services listed by frequency

Analogue television
These services were closed down on 20 November 2008. BBC2 Scotland was previously closed on 6 November.

Digital television
BBC A began broadcasting on 6 November 2008, Digital 3&4 on 20 November 2008, and BBC B on 30 November 2010.

External links
Yetholm at The Transmission Gallery

Transmitter sites in Scotland